Andreyevskaya is a rural locality (a village) in Kumzerskoye Rural Settlement, Kharovsky District, Vologda Oblast, Russia. The population was 2 as of 2002.

Geography 
Andreyevskaya is located 55 km northwest of Kharovsk (the district's administrative centre) by road. Pashinskaya is the nearest rural locality.

References 

Rural localities in Kharovsky District